Williamsburg is an unincorporated community in Green Township, Wayne County, in the U.S. state of Indiana.

The children of this community attend Northeastern Wayne Schools.

History
The earliest settlers in the Williamsburg area arrived from North Carolina in 1810, before Indiana became a state.
The town was laid out and platted in 1830, and was named after its founder, William Johnson. The post office at Williamsburg has been in operation since 1830.

Geography

References

Unincorporated communities in Wayne County, Indiana
Unincorporated communities in Indiana
1830 establishments in Indiana